Miss India may refer to:
 Femina Miss India, the most prestigious and oldest surviving national beauty pageant in India that started in 1964. It sends its winner to Miss World.
 Miss Diva, the national beauty pageant that sends its winners to Miss Universe and Miss Supranational. It is the sister pageant of Femina Miss India that started in 2013.
 Glamanand Supermodel India, the national beauty pageant that sends its winners to Miss International and Miss Grand International.
 Miss Divine Beauty, the national beauty pageant in India that sends its winners to Miss Earth and Miss Global.
 Miss India Queen, a national beauty pageant in India that sends its winner to Miss World Queen and runner-up will qualify to Miss Asia Queen.
 Miss India Worldwide India, a beauty pageant that selects India's representative for Miss India Worldwide
 Indian Princess, a beauty pageant in India started in 2010 that selects India's representative for Miss Tourism International and Top Model of the World
 Bharat Sundari, a former pageant in India that sent its winner to Miss World from 1968 to 1975. It also sent India's representative to Queen of Pacific (1973)
 I Am She–Miss Universe India, a former pageant in India that sent its winner to Miss Universe from 2010 and 2012 and runners-up to Miss Globe International and Miss Asia Pacific World
 Elite Model Look India, a model search contest in India that sends its winner to Elite Model Look
 Femina Look of the Year, a former model search contest that sent its winner to Elite Model Look contest from 1994 to 1999
 Miss Transqueen India, a beauty pageant that sends its winner to Miss International Queen
 Miss India, a 1957 film by Sachin Dev Burman
 Miss India (film), a 2020 film by Narendra Nath
 Miss India (TV series), a 2004 Indian television drama series that aired on DD National
 Miss India International
 Miss Earth India
 Miss India Australia
 Miss India USA
 Femina Miss India Bangalore
 Miss India CT
 Femina Miss India Delhi
 Femina Miss India South

India at Major Beauty Pageants

The following is a list of India's official representatives and their placements at the Major International Beauty Pageants. The country has won a total of twelve victories with eighty-nine placements in all six pageants:
 Three – Miss Universe crowns (1994 • 2000  • 2021)
 Six – Miss World crowns (1966 • 1994 • 1997 • 1999 • 2000 • 2017)
 One – Miss Earth crown (2010)
 Two – Miss Supranational crowns (2014 • 2016)

India won its first major international beauty pageant title when Reita Faria from India bagged the Miss World 1966 title, becoming the first Asian to win Miss World. In 1994, Sushmita Sen won Miss Universe 1994, becoming the country's first ever Miss Universe titleholder. Later that year, Aishwarya Rai added to the winning streak, picking up the Miss World 1994 title, making India the last country to ever win at both Miss Universe and Miss World in the same year in the 20th century.

Diana Hayden then won the Miss World 1997. Actor and model Yukta Mookhey was later crowned Miss World 1999. Six years after Sushmita Sen and Aishwarya Rai's double wins, Lara Dutta for Miss Universe 2000 and Priyanka Chopra for Miss World 2000 replicated the feat in 2000, marking the most recent time (as of ) that any country has won back-to-back at Miss World and, to date, the only time that any country won Miss Universe and Miss World in the same year in the 21st century. India's appearances at the Miss Universe semifinals from 1992 to 2002 made it the first country in the Eastern Hemisphere to place annually at the pageant for at least 10 consecutive years.

In 2010, Nicole Faria from Bangalore became the first Indian woman to win the Miss Earth 2010 pageant. Asha Bhat is the first Indian woman to win Miss Supranational 2014. Srinidhi Shetty from Mangalore duplicated the victory by winning Miss Supranational 2016 and making India only country to have a double victory in the history of that pageant. Manushi Chhillar won the Miss World 2017 title and became the sixth Indian woman to be crowned Miss World.

Colour Key

× Did not compete
↑ No pageant held

References

Beauty pageants in India
Indian awards